Kalinganagar is a planned industrial and modern town in Jajpur district of coastal Odisha, India. It is rich in iron ore. Because of high global demand for steel, Kalinganagar is becoming a major global hub in steel, power and ancillary products. A large number of steel plants including projects by Jindal Steel and Tata Steel are in various stages of implementation.

The city has been a main contributor to Odisha's economy, human resource and fast growing urbanization and industrialization. In ancient times, Jajapur was the capital of Great Kalinga Empire.

Kalinganagar is a major industrial center of Odisha. It houses companies like Tata Steel, NINL, Jindal, VISA, MESCO, Maithan Ispat Ltd and many more.

The government of India has given final approval to develop the Kalinganagar complex as a National Investment Manufacturing Zone under the National Manufacturing Policy. The major proposal at Kalinganagar NIMZ are Steel & Aluminium Downstream Park, New Industrial Township, Central Business District with office, Commercial and recreational activities, Common Tool Rooms, Technical Training Institutions and Support internal
infrastructure.

History
Kalinganagar is a geographical unit consisting of a compact landmass of Danagadi and Sukinda Blocks of Jajpur district of Odisha, India. Kalinganagar is neither a village nor a town. This is a name given to a geographical area by Odisha Industrial Infrastructure Development Corporation (IDCO)where the Govt. of Odisha aims at developing a steel-producers-hub. IDCO has acquired the land from public, has developed infrastructure and has given it to various industries for setting up Steel Plants. The process has started from the early 1990s and the ex-CM, late Biju Patanaik, took the lead role in promoting the steel-hub. He had invited first, Swaraj Paul, a NRI British industrialist to set up a steel plant which did not materialize though. Later, the industrial activity grew when his son Naveen Patnaik became the CM of Odisha. Now there are around 15 steel plants which includes public sector plant like NINL, private sector plant like JSL, MESCO etc. Tata Steel is setting up its Steel Plant here which would become operation by 2014 end.

On 2 January 2006 about 800 tribals protested against Tata Steel. Their protest focussed on the fact that land on which their cattle had grazed had been blocked by a wall. Further on they rallied for a fair compensation. To quash the protest Special Armed Police Forces were called in. According to the protesting tribals these police forces started to chase away the protesters. No attention was given to the fact that women and children were among them. More than 10 adivasi were killed by the police forces, more than 40 of them were wounded. This police brutality is still very vivid in the memory of the adivasi population. For many years adivasi have organized a protest activity on 2 January. In this tradition people marched from Chamakoila to Ambagadia on 2 January 2019. In Ambagadia at the martyrs’ tower a meeting took place, in which Rabindra Jaraka, secretary of Bisthapan Birodhi Jana Mancha (BBJM) stated the following: “The government has so far not explained any reason behind the firing. The state government is only keen on signing MOUs with the big corporate houses and practically gift away the best deposits of iron ore as captive mines at a meagre amount of royalty. Tata built the steel plant over the dead bodies of tribal people.” 

Today, lot of developmental activities are taking place in Kalinganagar area. Soon it will become a Municipality. There is peace and amity in the area. Tribal people are simple and hardworking here.Minerals like iron ore and chromite are located closer to this area. The river Brahmani flows nearby giving water opportunity. The area is also not prone to floods and cyclones. The district headquarters is at Jajpur Town and the nearest rail station is Jajpur-Keonjhar Road. Kalinganagar is located closer to Bhubaneswar, nearly 100 km, which is the state capital of Odisha. The area comes under Sukinda Legislative Assembly Constituency and Jajpur MP constituency. 2014: Rita Tarai(BJD) is the MP and Mr. Pritiranjan Gharai (BJD) is the MLA of Kalinganagar area.

Geography
Kalinganagar is situated in Jajpur District of Odisha, India. It comprises Byasanagar Municipality, Danagadi block.

Vision
In this connection, Lea Associates of South Asia in association with the School of Planning and Architect, New Delhi and the Centre for Environment and Planning (CEPT) presented a vision document to the Chief Minister for the development of Kalinganagar Industrial Area.

The Kalinganagar Industrial complex in Odisha has been a true realization of the socio-economic dream that would lead the State into a new era of prosperity. Made possible through dedicated efforts of the State Government over several years, the complex is slated to contribute to the net GDP of Odisha and provide its people with sustained employment and other forms of gainful engagement in the upcoming projects and their ancillaries.

After the success of Asia's first integrated steel plant set up by Tata Steel in the undivided Orissa-Bihar-Bengal in 1907, or the employment potential revealed by the Rourkela Steel Plant (operated by the state-owned Steel Authority of India), the demand for another mega steel plant in Odisha was strongly felt. This led Biju Patnaik, the then Chief Minister of Odisha to plan the Kalinganagar industrial complex, once 13000 acres of land was acquired in the Sukinda constituency of Jajpur district in 1992.

Today, the government is stepping up the presence of industry as coincidentally, the infrastructural boom in the global markets has generated high demands for steel. To strengthen the century-old relationship between Odisha and Tata Steel, the company signed the MoU for its most ambitious steel project in Odisha on 17 November 2004. As per this MoU, the company will set up a six million ton green-field integrated steel plant at Kalinganagar in Jajpur District of Odisha.

Economy
Kalinganagar is a global steel hub of international business and commerce and is one of the best industrial complexes having many manufacturing companies and corporations established and help in booming the India's economy (along with Jamshedpur and Rourkela).
Kalinganagar is a top-rated fastest growing town among India's other developed cities. Kalinganagar ranked higher according to criteria reflecting its presence on economy and industrial growth on similar lists as published by other entities. The town is a major center for banking and finance, retailing, steel, coal, iron, cromite mines trade, transportation, real estate, as well as traditional advertising, legal services, accountancy, insurance, theater, fashion, and the arts in the India.

IDCO has prepared master plan for Kalinganagar industrial complex. It has both public steel company like NINL and many private steel companies such as Tata Steel, Tata Power, Jindal Steel, VISA Steel, Mesco etc. and other companies like Emami, Container Corporation etc. Kalinga Nagar Development Authority (KNDA) will take over all development, planning and building regulations.

National Investment & Manufacturing Zone

Kalinganagar is declared as National Manufacturing and Investment Zone by Government of India. Government of Odisha is a pioneer in implementing the "Ease of Doing Business" and committed to simplify the processes and expedite project approvals. Aligning its objective with the national framework, Government of Odisha has identified many manufacturing industries as priority sectors and has an attractive incentive framework. Government of Odisha is also committed in providing 24x7 power, dedicated industrial feeder and quality physical infrastructure and common facilities.

Tata Steel
Tata Steel has started its production from Kalinganagar Plant. Local DPs, PAPS, periphery people are getting contract work and getting employment. DP (displaced persons) are able to live a better life due to business opportunity and jobs. People have reposed much trust on them. T. V. Narendran's elevation as MD Tata Steel has also helped the Kalinganagar in terms of building a professional culture.

In partnership with the Government of Odisha, Tata Steel is committed to set up a 6 million-tonne per annum integrated steel plant at Kalinganagar Industrial Complex at Duburi, in the Jajpur district. The steel works will be established in two modules of 3 million tonnes of steel each and when completed, will have a capacity of 6 million tonnes per annum.

Special attention has been given to all the requirements of the families in rehabilitation colonies and resettlement camps that are fully equipped with all amenities. With Kalinganagar emerging as the steel hub of Odisha, Tata Steel will help boost the pace of industrialization and socio-economic development, not only in the State but in the Country as well.

In 2012, Maniapatala village was added where 39 families are to be displaced, taking the total number of families to be displaced to 1234. As of 15 December 2012, 993 families (out of 1234 families) have relocated voluntarily in support of the project.

Tata Power
Tata Power planned to set up a power plant at Kalinganagar, Odisha, with capacity 3×67.5 MW (gas based) + 3×150 MW (coal+gas based): The project is being executed through Industrial Energy Limited, a joint venture of the company with Tata Steel Limited in the eastern part of Odissa. Tata Power's Kalinganagar Project has been implementing regular CSR activities in this area with partnership of local community, government, youth clubs, PRI members and local institutions on various developmental issues.

Neelachal Ispat Nigam Limited
Neelachal Ispat Nigam Limited (NINL), a company promoted by MMTC Ltd, Industrial Promotion and Investment Corporation of Orissa limited (IPICOL) and other government agencies has set up a 1.1 million ton Integrated Iron and steel plant at Kalinganagar, Duburi, Dist-Jajpur, Orissa. Presently the main products are pig iron and LAM coke along with nut coke, coke breeze, crude tar, ammonium sulphate and granulated slag (phase – I). The envisaged products in future (phase-II) are billets, bars and wire rods of different grades and sizes. NINL has its own captive power plant to meet the internal power requirement. NINL is also exporting substantial quantity of power. NINL is having own captive iron ore mines which is under development.

NINL has become India's largest exporter of saleable pig iron since 2004–2005. Pig iron and LAM coke produced by NINL has established its acceptance in domestic as well as in international markets .Company is widely catering demands of eastern, central and northern regions of India for pig iron apart from exports. It is supplying LAM coke to almost all steel plants of Steel authority of India Ltd. and Rashtriya Ispat Nigam Ltd. Vishakhapatanam. The "KAMDHENU" fertiliser produced is in high demand in nearby areas. Crude tar is being despatched to down stream industries for further processing.

Jindal Stainless Limited
Jindal Stainless, a part of the US$18 billion, OP Jindal group is the largest integrated manufacturer of stainless steel in India and is ranked amongst the top 10 stainless steel manufacturers in the world, with a capacity of 1.8 million tons. A leader and a name synonymous with Enterprise, Excellence and Success, the company's ethos mirrors most characteristics similar to the metal it produces; Akin to stainless steel Jindal Stainless is innovative and versatile in its thought process; strong and unrelenting in its operations. JSL has crafted its success story by fully integrating its operations based on a strategy of both, backward and forward integration, starting from mining, melting, casting, hot rolling to cold rolling and further value additions .

This has been the driving philosophy of the company from its one unit presence in the early 1970s to its present multi-location presence across the globe. An ISO: 14001 compliant, JSL product range includes: ferro alloys, stainless steel slabs, blooms, hot rolled coils, plates and cold rolled coils/ sheets, stainless steel strips for razor blade steel and coin blanks for mints in India and the EU.

VISA Steel
VISA Steel is operating a 0.5 million TPA Integrated Special Steel Plant, 50,000 TPA Ferro Chrome plant and 75 MW captive power plant at Kalinganagar in Odisha. The company is also progressing towards establishing a steel plant at Raigarh in Chhattisgarh and plans to set up a steel plant and Manganese Alloy Plant in Madhya Pradesh.

Emami Cement
Emami Cement limited is setting up a cement grinding plant at Kalinganagar, Odisha, which will have an installed capacity of 2.50 million tonnes per year. Emami manufacturing plants are strategically located in close proximity to the raw materials that Emami require for operations and are well connected to our key markets by rail and road.

Maithan Ispat Limited
Maithan Ispat Limited is a part of the INR 15 bn Maithan Group, having manufacturing interests in refractories, ferro-alloys, cement, DRI, rebars, billets and sections. The Group is headquartered in Kolkata, India with nine manufacturing facilities spread across six states in India. The company was set up in 2004 under an MOU with the state of Odisha at Kalinganagar, Jajpur. The company possesses an integrated facility, straddling the value chain from ore to finished steel. The company manufactures steel through the DRI-IF-LRF-HSM route.

Rohit Ferrotech
A player in the ferro alloy manufacturing sector, Rohit Ferro-Tech Limited (RFTL) operates. Promoted by S K Patni, RFTL started in 2003 with a capacity of 24,000 TPA from its 2x9 MVA furnaces in Bishnupur, West Bengal. With its continuous expansions every year, the group now has a total installed capacity of  mtpa. The company is also setting up a 67 MW Captive Power Plant at its jajpur unit to feed its energy requirements. In an attempt to forward-integrate, RFTL has set up a 100,000 TPA stainless steel manufacturing facility at its Bishnupur unit and the capacity use is being enhanced in phases. On the side of backward integration, RFTL has acquired economic interest in coal mines in Indonesia securing thermal and coking coal requirements of its manufacturing facilities

K.J. Ispat
KJ Ispat Limited is a public company incorporated on 18 March 2003. It is classified as an Indian non-government company and is registered at Registrar of Companies, Cuttack. Its authorized share capital is Rs. 80,000,000 and its paid up capital is Rs. 66,900,000. kJ Ispat Limited's Annual General Meeting (AGM) was last held on 30 September 2013 and as per records from Ministry of Corporate Affairs (MCA), its balance sheet was last filed on 31 March 2013.

Dinabandhu Steel and Power Ltd
DSPL Is an integrated steel plant with captive power plant located in Kalinganagar, Jajpur the upcoming steel hub of Orissa. It is manufacturer, distributor and supplier of steel rod service provider of generation of thermal power plant.

Pradhan Industries

The company Pradhan Industries as a partnership organization established in 1989 having its registered office at Jajpur Road, Dist-Jajpur, Orissa-755048, Orissa established its first Chrome Ore processing and beneficiation plant at sanapatuli, Dala, Jajpur Road, Dist-Jajpur with a steady and substantial growth established its market network in Indian nation. In due course it emerged in 1999 as a private Limited Company and spread the operating net work from National to International level having Export of Chrome Concentrate to different countries, having a growth rate of 100% per year. The company entered into ferro alloy manufacturing and started its second plant at Bhagwanpur Industrial Estate in 1992, Dist-khurda, Orissa, having its end product of low carbon ferro chrome, and successfully operated low carbon ferro chrome business in national level.

MESCO
Mideast Integrated Steel Ltd. (MISL) was incorporated in 1992 with assets in coastal Odisha in eastern India. It secured the Roida iron ore mining lease in the prime iron ore belt of Odisha in 1996. MISL's pig iron plant at Jajpur was successfully commissioned in 2005 and has since been operating uninterrupted. MISL has a strategic alliance with Stemcor, UK, for marketing and financing.
It is also the first company in India to have technical collaboration with CMIEC now known as Sino Steel, China. MISL's negligible debt to equity ratio makes it essentially debt-free – the only company of this size in the iron and steel business in the country.

POSCO
Global steel company POSCO is likely to shift its first Finex plant to Kalinganagar, Odisha from Pohang, South Korea after a definitive pact with homegrown steelmaker Mesco, which is scheduled by August. POSCO has already signed an initial pact with MESCO for shifting of its patented Finex technology plant at Mesco premises at Kalinganagar in Jajpur.

IDICOL Ferro Chrome Alloys Ltd
IFCAL, a wholly owned subsidiary of IDCOL, is a government of Orissa undertaking located at Jajpur Road. It has capacity to manufacture 19,000 MT of high carbon ferrochrome. This plant, set up in 1969, is pioneer in the country to produce ferrochrome. The plant produces high carbon ferrochrome by using chromite ore, chromite briquettes, friable lumps, hard lumps in various proportions to meet customers' requirements.

Uttam Galva Steels Ltd has been allotted 192.13 acres in Kalinganagar for its plant, similarly, Brahmani River Pellets Ltd also allotted 37.67 acres of land and Apeejay Surrendra Group has been allotted 3.01 acres land in Kalinganagar.

Binani Cement Limited which had initially decided to set up a cement plant at Dhamra in Bhadrak district had been allowed to shift its unit to Kalinga Nagar in Jajpur district. Maa Mangala Minerals Industry is a mineral company situated at Duburi, Jajpur. There is also other companies like Maharashtra Seamless Ltd, Mahesh Ferrous (P) Ltd, Mishrilal Mines Pvt. Ltd, Shree Bimal Oxygen & Minerals Pvt.Ltd. which are operating in the city.

Kalinganagar Development Authority (KNDA)
Kalinganagar Development Authority is coming under Jajpur districts of Odisha. The Kalinganagar Industrial Complex is integrally related to the vision of a resurgent Odisha. The idea took shape in the early 90s, concurrently with several other initiatives that followed the much-awaited economic liberalization. The Odisha Industrial Infrastructure Development Corporation (IDCO) was entrusted with the task of developing infrastructure facilities in Kalinganagar to facilitate the growth of industries in the area. As per the draft of a master plan, for Kalinganagar released in 2006 about 10-lakh hectares land would be acquired by the Government, gradually and in different phases for the development of the area. In addition, it was decided to shift the District Industries Centre (DIC) from Jajpur to Kalinganagar and establish Kalinganagar Development Authority.

The meeting resolved to prepare mobility plan indicating the inner ring road adjacent to the town. The available government land along the ring road could be leveraged for funding the ring road project. It suggested the financial model adopted by Rajasthan government should be followed for implementation of ring road and proposed CDP roads.

Prior to that, a project for rehabilitation of slums with an area of about 10 acres could be initiated. Bhubaneswar Development Authority would be roped in for technical support for development of affordable housing for rehabilitation of slum families.

Recently KNDA met to take several policy decision regarding approval of building plans as well as approval of Comprehensive Development Plan (CDP) of the area. Kalinganagar area in Jajpur district is home for several steel and power plants. The area is fast developing into an industrial township.

According to the Housing and Urban Development department, all industrial buildings plans would be approved by the authority after due approval of the Building Permission Committee of the KNDA. "If required the compounding fee would be collected as per the norms of the regulation for approval of building plans," the authority resolved.

It also made it clear that industries those had not submitted the plans or documents for approval of their building plan would be issued with unauthorized notice or stop construction notice simultaneously.

Vision 2030

A draft of the Comprehensive Development Plan of Kalinganagar Development Plan Area for 161 nos of village i.e. 20 villages of Vyasanagar Municipality, 41 villages of Sukinda Tahasil, 65 villages of Danagadi Tahasil, 29 villages of Vyasanagar Tahasil and 6 villages of Rasulpur Tahasil covering an area of 458.78 km2 has been prepared.

Envisaging transformation of the Kalinganagar Industrial Complex into a modern industrial city in eastern India, Comprehensive Development Plan, which has now been placed in public domain seeking suggestions and objections, has projected investment requirement to the order of Rs. 661.39 billion.
Kalingnagar Development Authority (KNDA) has assigned Rolta India Limited, a private consulting firm, to prepare CDP for the area.

"The KNDA CDP will require a total investment of Rs. 661.39 billion out of which the investment in public sector will be around Rs. 608.89 billion and in private sector, the investment will be around Rs. 52.50 billion in the proposed plan period (by 2030)", the plan says.

Phases

The CDP has proposed to implement the plan in a phased manner – short term and long term. Short term is defined as next five years, while long-term implementation will span beyond five years. For short-term plan implementation, planners have estimated Rs. 1,235 crore while in the long-term plan Rs. 66,139 crore will be required.

An analysis of population growth and assessing the future development, planners have arrived at a population figure of 5,39,000 for KNDA area by 2030. At present, different industries operating in the area give direct employment to 23,000 persons. "KNDA is going to be mega industrial complex in future. At present 11 major industries are operating in KNDA area. In addition to this, five major industries are under construction which will come up by 2015. Owing to the transport linkages with mineral resources, region of the State of KNDA area has got tremendous potential for industrial growth," the development plan says.

The plan has given emphasis on land banking for future industrial development and road network. "Looking to the pattern of industrial growth, the total area earmarked for industrial activities is 7900 ha as against existing 4090 ha."

Similarly, Rolta India has suggested laying of 200 ft wide major arterial road and 100 ft wide local arterial road.

"The total length of 100 ft and 200 ft proposed road is 100.47 km and 90.48 km respectively. The total land required for the road is computed to be 873.01 ha. Out of this, 375.91 ha are under government ownership," the CDP points out.

As far as water is concerned, planners said the river Brahmani would play a very critical role for future of growth of the area. As per projection, about 1,07,800 houses will be required by 2030. After deducting the present housing stock, a total 94,571 new houses will be required in the KNDA area by 2030. Thus, per year on an average 4,728 new houses are required to be constructed to meet the requirement. An additional 3,796 ha will be required.

The area to be developed into a modern city with Rs. 66,139 crore. KNDA has come out with a report on the development model. At present, industries in the area provided direct employment to 23,000 persons. Five major industries are under construction and they will come up by 2015.

Transport 
The nearest railway stations are Jajpur Keonjhar Road railway station, Baghuapal Railway Station, Sukinda Road Railway Station and Jakhapura Railway Station. The nearest airport is Biju Patnaik International Airport in Bhubaneswar.

There are a lot of small railway stations in Kalinganagar. It is connected by Indian Railways through Jajpur-Keonjhar Road (JJKR) Railway Station, Baghuapal Railway Station, Sukinda Road Railway Station and Jakhapura Railway Station. It comes under East Coast Railways Zone of India Railways. National Highway−215 connect Kalinganagar with two way wide highways. It's well connected with Anandapur and Panikoili and is 100 km from Bhubaneswar and 400 km from Kolkata through National Highways. An inland Water Ways has been planned to connect Kalinganagar township with Dhamara Port, Odisha and Paradeep Port, Odisha. A domestic airport has been proposed at Ragadi for Kalinganagar.

Languages
Most people can speak and write all three languages Odia, Hindi & English.

Art and culture
Vyasa Sarovar Mela (now called Vyasa Mahotsava) is the most famous festival in Jajpur Road. Kalinga Nagar Mahotsav is held at Jajpur Road on 1–2 February every year. Cultural programme are being organised on the occasion, where Prince Dance Group, Brahmapur participated, besides Chhau from Mayurbhan and Odissi from Bhubaneswar was also shown. The industrial houses of Kalingnagar like TATA, NINL, VISA, Jindal, Rohit and MESCO put their stalls on the function ground.
It is the land of rich and diverse artistic achievement, Kalinganagar's art and culture are the product of a long historical process in which the spiritual, philosophical and the humane dimensions have merged to yield the finest effects of culture and civilized life. The cultural heritage of Kalinganagar is reflected in its vibrant art forms.

The city has a tradition of painting, architectures, sculpture, and handicrafts. Goddess Saraswati, Kali, Laxmi, Durga puja are celebrated by devotees. In some festivals, Muruja is drawn on the floor with colour powders of different hues. Also Ganesh Chaturthi, Maha Shivaratri are widely celebrated among by people in the city.

Sports

Rajiv Gandhi Stadium is located on Jajpur road. People here play cricket, hockey, kabaddi, kho-kho, football, and badminton.

Health
Vyasanagar Municipality is having a sub-divisional hospital as per Odisha state norms. But it does not having much more facility as Kalinganagar is a rapidly growing city. There is a long-standing demand for making a super specialist hospital by state government.

There are many nursing homes and private diagnostic centers which are operating in Vyasanagar municipality. Tata Steel is all set to establish a 200-bed hospital at Gobarghati in Kalinganagar industrial complex of Orissa's Jajpur district.

The hospital in Gobarghati rehabilitation colony is set up on an area of four acres of land. The setting up of this hospital is primarily dedicated to those families that were affected by Tata Steel's Greenfield project at Kalinganagar, in the Jajpur district of Odisha and also for the people in periphery villages. It would be a 200-bed hospital and would cater to around 10000 people from the neighbouring villages apart from Tata Steel Parivar members.

The hospital would also be well equipped with round-the-clock service, pathology laboratory, OPD, an outdoor complex, paramedical staff and specialist doctors in Medicine, Paediatrics, Surgery and O&G. The ceremonial puja for this hospital has already been performed at Maniapatla. Mr. Hridayeshwar Jha, Vice President, Odisha Project of Tata Steel, graced this occasion. The hospital intends to plan health services like rural health check-up programmes, health camps during epidemics and awareness building activities for people once it is functional.

Education
Kalinganagar has the following schools and colleges,
 Buchpan school, Kanheipur, Jajpur Road
 Saraswati Shishu Vidya Mandir
 V.N High School, Jajpur Road
 Doon International School
 St. Marys School, Jajpur Road
 Budharaja Bidyapitha-Danagadi
 Mount Litera Zee School
 Glorious English Medium School, Jajpur Road
 Stewart School, Sukhinda Chromite Mines
 Shemrock Golap Preschool, Kachahudi Hudisahi, Jajpur Road
 Dhabalgiri High School
 SBD International School, Santara, Patuli, Jajpur Road
 Ferrochrome High School
 V N High School, Jajpur Road
 St. Xavier's High School, Jajpur Road
 DAV Public School, Kendriya Vidyalaya (KV) and other national schools have been planned at Talagada, Jajpur Road in near future.
 Vyasanagar College Jajpur Road
 Indira Gandhi women's college, Jajpur Road
 Sukinda College,Sukinda
 Kapileswar Mahabidyalaya,Duburi

References

External links
 Byasanagar Municipality, Kalinga Nagar

Cities and towns in Jajpur district